Matthew Lentink (born 18 August 1993) is an Aruban footballer who plays for Derde Divisie club VV Goes and the Aruba national football team as a goalkeeper.

Club career
After his first senior club RBC Roosendaal filed for bankruptcy in June 2011, Lentink joined VV Goes competing in the Eerste Klasse. He played there for three seasons, and went on a trial with professional club NAC Breda before signing with VV Kloetinge on 10 May 2014. His spell at the club lasted four years, and he joined Zeelandia afterwards. After one season there, a season followed at VC Vlissingen before Lentink decided to return to VV Goes. There, he was part of a historic KNVB Cup fixture against ODIN '59 in October 2020, beating the record for most penalty kicks taken in a competitive game in Zeeland ever, with 34. The former record was held by DOSKO and VV Terneuzen, who kicked 30 penalties in 2000 before a winner was found.

International career
Lentink is an international of Aruba, having made his debut for the national side on 28 March 2014 in a friendly against Guam.

References

External links

1993 births
Living people
RBC Roosendaal players
VV Goes players
Eerste Divisie players
Derde Divisie players
Aruban footballers
Aruba international footballers
Association football goalkeepers
People from Oranjestad, Aruba
VV Kloetinge players
VC Vlissingen players
SV River Plate Aruba players